Walter McK. Jones School (Spanish: Escuela Walter McK. Jones) is a historic school building located in Villalba Pueblo, the administrative and historic center of the municipality of Villalba, Puerto Rico. The school was designed by famed Puerto Rican architect Rafael Carmoega and built in 1926, with additional modifications finished in 1947. The school is a prime example of the early 20th century school architecture in Puerto Rico, and it was added to the National Register of Historic Places on January 29, 2013.

See also 
 National Register of Historic Places listings in central Puerto Rico

References 

School buildings on the National Register of Historic Places in Puerto Rico
School buildings completed in 1926
1926 establishments in Puerto Rico
Mission Revival architecture in Puerto Rico
Spanish Revival architecture in Puerto Rico
Villalba, Puerto Rico